In algebra, the integral closure of an ideal I of a commutative ring R, denoted by , is the set of all elements r in R that are integral over I: there exist  such that

It is similar to the integral closure of a subring. For example, if R is a domain, an element r in R belongs to  if and only if there is a finitely generated R-module M, annihilated only by zero, such that . It follows that  is an ideal of R (in fact, the integral closure of an ideal is always an ideal; see below.) I is said to be integrally closed if .

The integral closure of an ideal appears in a theorem of Rees that characterizes an analytically unramified ring.

Examples 
It satisfies the equation , where is in the ideal.
Radical ideals (e.g., prime ideals) are integrally closed. The intersection of integrally closed ideals is integrally closed.
In a normal ring, for any non-zerodivisor x and any ideal I, . In particular, in a normal ring, a principal ideal generated by a non-zerodivisor is integrally closed.
Let  be a polynomial ring over a field k. An ideal I in R is called monomial if it is generated by monomials; i.e., . The integral closure of a monomial ideal is monomial.

Structure results 
Let R be a ring. The Rees algebra  can be used to compute the integral closure of an ideal. It also follows that the integral closure of a homogeneous ideal is homogeneous.

The following type of results is called the Briancon–Skoda theorem: let R be a regular ring and  an ideal generated by  elements. Then  for any .

A theorem of Rees states: let (R, m) be a noetherian local ring. Assume it is formally equidimensional (i.e., the completion is equidimensional.). Then two m-primary ideals  have the same integral closure if and only if they have the same multiplicity.

See also 

 Dedekind–Kummer theorem

Notes

References 
 Eisenbud, David, Commutative Algebra with a View Toward Algebraic Geometry, Graduate Texts in Mathematics, 150, Springer-Verlag, 1995, .

Further reading 
Irena Swanson, Rees valuations.

Commutative algebra
Ring theory
Algebraic structures